Buddug is a feminine given name of Welsh origin. It means "victorious" and is associated with traits such as, leadership, intelligence, and optimism. It is the modern Welsh form of Boudica.

Notable Buddugs
 Buddug (d. AD 60 or 61), British queen of the Iceni tribe, who led the revolt against occupying Roman forces.
 Buddug Verona James, mezzo-soprano
 Buddug Williams is a Welsh actress, best known for her roles in the long-running television soap Pobol y Cwm 

Welsh feminine given names